Ramsay Paul Bogunovich (born 23 March 1961) is a former Australian rules footballer who played with Geelong in the Victorian Football League (VFL).

Bogunovich was recruited from Swan Districts in Western Australia. A ruckman, Bogunovich made six senior appearances for Geelong, two in the 1981 VFL season and four in the 1982 VFL season. He played in winning reserves grand finals for three successive years, 1980, 1981 and 1982. He returned to Western Australia in 1983, playing with West Perth for two further seasons.

References

External links 

Ramsay Bogunovich's WAFL statistics from WAFL Footy Facts

1961 births
Australian rules footballers from Western Australia
Geelong Football Club players
Swan Districts Football Club players
West Perth Football Club players
Living people